Mount Cook is an Australian national park located in Queensland,  northwest of Brisbane. It was established in 1970 and is managed by the Queensland Parks and Wildlife Service.

Within this National Park is a difficult walking track that is  return to the summit of Mount Cook.

See also

 Protected areas of Queensland

References

National parks of Far North Queensland
Protected areas established in 1970